Broad River Airpark  is a private airport located  south of Lavonia, a city in Franklin County, Georgia, United States. The runway is parallel to Interstate 85. The air park was built in 2006.

References

External links 

Airports in Georgia (U.S. state)
Buildings and structures in Franklin County, Georgia
Transportation in Franklin County, Georgia